Jatrabari Thana is a metropolitan thana within the megacity of Dhaka in central Bangladesh. It is known for its steel furniture industry.

Administration
Jatrabari Thana consists of parts of Matuail and Ward 87 in addition to Ward 84, Ward 85 and Ward 86 of Dhaka South City Corporation. It contains 17 mouzas and mahallas.

Geography
(Dhaka metropolitan; Postal code: 1204) area , located in between 23°42' and 23°43' north latitudes and in between 90°20' and 90°22' east longitudes, at the starting point of Dhaka-Chittagong Highway. It is bounded by sabujbagh and Demra thanas on the north, Kadamtali and shyampur thanas on the south, Demra thana on the east, Gandaria and sutrapur thanas on the west.

Education

Jatrabari thana is famous for educational institutions such as Jatrabari Ideal High School, City Corporation Adarsha High School and College, Dania College, Dr. Mahbubur Rahman Mollah College. Other educational institutions include Tamirul Millat Kamil Madrasa, Matuail Multilateral High School, Matuail Girls High School, Matuail Adarsha High School, Matuail Latif Bhiuyh College, Bornomala High School, nobarun school and college and Abdullah Mollah High School. There is also the Jamia Muhammadia Arabia, which is in northern Jatrabari and is one of the largest Ahl-i Hadith madrasas in the country.

Facilities
There are numerous mosques in Jatrabari Thana, most notably Babar Mosque, Dhalpur Zakarin Jame Mosque, Baytul Aman, Dhalpur Narikel Bagan Jame Mosque.

References 

Geography of Dhaka
Thanas of Dhaka